Isaac Kiprop (born 10 September 1986) is a Ugandan mountain runner who won one World Mountain Running Championships (2014).

References

External links
 
 Isaac Kiprop at Association of Road Racing Statisticians

1986 births
Living people
Place of birth missing (living people)
Ugandan mountain runners
Ugandan male long-distance runners
World Mountain Running Championships winners
20th-century Ugandan people
21st-century Ugandan people